South Carolina has a humid subtropical climate, with hot summers throughout most of the State. But, an exception does occur in the Blue Ridge Mountains, as outlier pockets of an Oceanic Climate do exist. Mild winters predominate in the eastern and southern part of the state, but cool to occasionally cold winters are the standard in the northwestern area of the state, especially areas at or above 600 feet in elevation. Tropical cyclones, and afternoon thunderstorms due to hot and humid conditions, contribute to precipitation during the summer and sometimes fall months, while extratropical cyclones contribute to precipitation during the fall, winter, and spring months. The coast experiences nearly all of their tropical weather impacts from storms coming directly from the Atlantic coast. The northwestern area of the state can receive impacts from both Atlantic basin storms moving westward from the coast and also occasionally very heavy rainfall and flooding from storms originating from the Gulf of Mexico that move inland towards the northeast after making landfall from the Florida Panhandle to Louisiana.

Tornadoes happen mostly in the spring, with a secondary peak in November. Hail and damaging winds often occur in summertime thunderstorms. Tornadoes are very uncommon in the summer unless a tropical disturbance were to spawn one.

Temperatures
South Carolina has a humid subtropical climate (Köppen climate classification Cfa), although high elevation areas in the "Upstate" area have less subtropical characteristics than areas on the Atlantic coastline. Winter temperatures are much less uniform.

Precipitation

While precipitation is abundant the entire year in almost the entire state, the coastline tends to have a slightly wetter summer, while inland March tends to be the wettest month. During the cold season, extratropical cyclones is the main cause of precipitation, while during the summer, tropical cyclones and thunderstorms forming due to afternoon heating are the main causes of precipitation. A lee side rain shadow from the Appalachian Mountains lowers annual precipitation across central portions of the state. Winter precipitation is determined in large by the El Niño-Southern Oscillation. During El Niño events, the jet stream is further south and east across the U.S., thus leading to cooler and wetter winters in South Carolina, while La Niña keeps the jet stream further north and west causing warmer and drier winters.

Snowfall and ice

Annual snowfall across South Carolina varies greatly in frequency and amounts, from being quite rare with little to no accumulation in the southern coastal areas to being very common annually with 2 to 3 small snowfall events in the Upstate, particularly along and north of Interstate 85, which essentially is built along the 850 to 900 feet elevation contour.  In the southern coastal area near and below Charleston, several years might pass without any measurable snowfall.  In the Greenville, Spartanburg, and Anderson areas, total annual amounts range from 2 to 5 inches, with occasional annual totals reaching 8 or more inches (cumulatively).  A year without at least one snow event in the Upstate is quite unusual. The Midlands is the least predictable area of the state in experiencing snowfall events.  About 5 out of every 10 years, the region will have no snowfall at all; however in the 5 out of 10 years that the region receives snow, the accumulations are anywhere from under an inch to occasionally as much as 4 to 5 inches.  The snowiest location in the state, above 2,000 feet in elevation, averages  of snow a year in the Blue Ridge Escarpment area.  Freezing rain is more common than snow around and southeast of Columbia.  Along the southern coastal barrier islands, frozen precipitation of any type is very rare, with only a few snow events on record.

Tropical cyclones

The state is prone to tropical cyclones. This is an annual concern during hurricane season, which is from June through November. The peak time of vulnerability for the southeast Atlantic coast is from early August to early October when tropical cyclone frequency is highest. Major hurricanes can impact the Palmetto state, though there are no category 5 impacts on record. Two of the stronger hurricanes to strike South Carolina in recent times are Hurricane Hazel (1954) and Hurricane Hugo (1989), which were of category 4 strength. For weaker systems, rainfall and spin-up tornadoes in the outer bands are the main impacts to the state. The wettest known tropical cyclone to impact South Carolina was a tropical depression named Jerry in 1995 which stalled nearby and had previously been a tropical storm across Florida.

Thunderstorms and tornadoes
South Carolina averages around 64 days of thunderstorm activity per year. Most thunderstorms occur during the summer. South Carolina is vulnerable to tornadoes. Some notable tornadoes have struck South Carolina and the state averages around 14 tornadoes annually.  There have been no F-5/EF-5 tornadoes on record but over a dozen F-4/EF-4 tornadoes have occurred in many counties in South Carolina.

Monthly normals and extremes for select cities

Statewide climate data

Climate change

See also
 Climate of the United States
 List of wettest tropical cyclones in South Carolina
 United States rainfall climatology
 List of earthquakes in South Carolina

Notes

References

 
South Carolina